Leonida Barboni (23 November 1909 –  6 November 1970) was an Italian film cinematographer.

Life and career 
Born in Fiuminata, Macerata, Barboni started his career working as a cameraman for Fox Movietone and Paramount newsreels. He later worked as a cinematographer for documentaries, and in 1942 he made his feature film debut with La fanciulla dell'altra riva. After the war Barboni started a critical acclaimed collaboration with the director Pietro Germi and with the set designer Carlo Egidi. His style was characterized by the proliferation of small light sources, a great attention to detail and by the use of  'deep focus' shots. He was the elder brother of the cinematographer and director Enzo Barboni.

Selected filmography 

 A Night of Fame (1949)
 In the Name of the Law (1949)
 Sunday in August (1950)
 Path of Hope (1950)
 The Devil in the Convent (1950)
 Ragazze da marito (1952)
 Red Shirts (1952)
 The Bandit of Tacca Del Lupo (1952)
 Mademoiselle Gobete (1952)
 Jealousy (1953)
 The Enchanting Enemy (1953)
 Neapolitans in Milan (1953)
 Adriana Lecouvreur (1955)
 Angela (1955)
 Il coraggio (1955)
 The Railroad Man (1956)
 Dreams in a Drawer (1956)
 Fathers and Sons (1957)
 A Man of Straw (1958)
 Nella città l'inferno (1959)
 The Great War (1959)
 The Facts of Murder (1959)
 The Hunchback of Rome (1960)
 The Passionate Thief (1960)
 Run with the Devil (1960)
 The Traffic Policeman (1960)
 Divorce Italian Style (1961)
 Black City (1961)
 The Lovemakers (1961)
 A Difficult Life (1961)
 Disorder (1962)
 The Captive City (1962)
 The Verona Trial (1963)
 Liolà (1963)
 Corruption (1963)
 Countersex (1964)
 Amori pericolosi (1964)
 The Possessed (1965)
 The Dolls (1965)
 After the Fox (1966)
 Pleasant Nights (1966)
 Sex Quartet (1966)
 The Witch (1966)
 El Greco (1966)
 The Rover (1967)
 Bora Bora (1968)
 The Sex of Angels (1968)
 Tre donne - La sciantosa  (ТВ) (1970)
 1870 (1971)

References

External links 
 

 

1909 births
1970 deaths
People from the Province of Macerata
Italian cinematographers